The Highland Folk Museum is a museum and open-air visitor attraction in Newtonmore in Badenoch and Strathspey in the Scottish Highlands, United Kingdom. It is owned by the Highland Council and administered by High Life Highland. It was founded in 1935 by Dr. Isabel Frances Grant (1887–1983).

History
In 1930, Grant organised and curated the 'Highland Exhibition' in Inverness, with 2,100 artefacts gathered and exhibited as a 'national folk museum'. She founded the Highland Folk Museum in 1935, using a personal legacy to acquire a disused former United Free Church on the island of Iona; Grant recorded 800 visitors in the first summer of opening and 900 the following year. Nicknamed Am Fasgadh (Gaelic for ‘The Shelter’), the Highland Folk Museum's remit was "…to shelter homely ancient Highland things from destruction", and Grant collected assiduously to that end; by 1938 the collection had outgrown its home. 

In 1939, the museum moved to larger premises on the mainland at Laggan, Badenoch: a village in the central Highlands, where Am Fasgadh was sited for the next five years. The outbreak of the Second World War, and resultant restrictions on movement along the west coast and islands of Scotland, meant that Grant was unable to collect during this period, while petrol shortages contributed to a general reduction in the numbers of visitors to the museum. In 1943 she purchased Pitmain Lodge, a large Georgian house, together with three acres of land near to the train station at Kingussie, about twelve miles east of Laggan, and on 1 June 1944 the Highland Folk Museum opened once again to the public.

The collections at Kingussie were developed "…to show different aspects of the material setting of life in the Highlands in byegone days" and included a range of objects: furniture, tools, farming implements, horse tackle, cooking and dining artefacts, pottery, glass, musical instruments, sporting equipment, weapons, clothing and textiles, jewellery, books, photographs and archive papers. The collection also included accounts of superstitions, stories and songs, and home-crafted items including basketry, Barvas ware and treen. The site at Kingussie also enabled Grant to develop a suite of replica buildings: including an Inverness-shire cottage, a Lewis blackhouse and a Highland but-and-ben. These buildings and the use of ‘live demonstrations’ to interpret exhibits for visitors sealed the Highland Folk Museum's popular reputation as the first open-air museum on mainland Britain.

When Grant retired in 1954, ownership of the Highland Folk Museum and its collections was taken over by a Trust formed by the four ancient Scottish universities (Aberdeen, Edinburgh, Glasgow and St. Andrews). George ‘Taffy’ Davidson, senior fellow in arts and crafts at the University of Aberdeen, was appointed curator in 1956 and developed the collections in parallel with his own antiquarian interests, which included folk music. He accepted  large numbers of gifts in subsequent years. In 1975, the Highland Regional Council took over management of the museum. Ross Noble of the Scottish Country Life Museums Trust was appointed curator and a process of modernisation began. Noble introduced open, thematic displays and re-introduced live demonstrations as part of popular ‘Heritage In Action’ days for visitors. 

In the early 1980s, an eighty-acre site was acquired at Newtonmore – about three miles to the south of Kingussie - and work began to lay out four distinct areas. 'Aultlarie Croft' reproduced a 1930s working farm; Balameanach (Gaelic for ‘Middle Village’)  established a developing community of relocated buildings; the Pinewoods, created an area of forest with interlinking paths; and Baile Gean served at the Highland Folk Museum's reconstruction of an early 1700s Highland township. The Newtonmore site opened to the public in 1987 and operated in tandem with Am Fasgadh until the closure of that site in Kingussie in 2007. In 2011, responsibility for the day-to-day running of the Highland Folk Museum and its collections was handed over to High Life Highland – an arm's-length charity formed by the Highland Council to develop culture, health and wellbeing, learning, leisure and sports across the region. The new Am Fasgadh - a modern, purpose-built collections storage facility and conference venue - opened in 2014, and in 2015, the collections at the Highland Folk Museum received official ‘Recognition’ from Museums Galleries Scotland and the Scottish Government as a ‘Nationally Significant Collection’.

Exhibits
The museum is primarily made up of three areas that represent and interpret three separate eras of the Scottish highlands. The west of the park primarily features the Pine Woods and the 1700s Township. The Open Air Section to the east, consists of buildings that reproduce built heritage from the nineteenth to mid twentieth centuries. The reconstructions in each area are supported by  a staff member dressed and performing as a highlander in the exhibit's setting, and on certain days, the museum features demonstrations of highland life activities, such as weaving or rope making.
 
While some of the buildings on the museum site were built there, many have been relocated from other places around the highlands and reconstructed onsite. In the early 2000s, the museum acquired the Glenlivet sub-post office. In 2011, a thatched cottage was recreated from a photo taken in the 19th century of a house that stood in Grantown-on-Spey. The following year, a croft-house built in Carrbridge in the 1920s was donated and plans were drawn up to move it 22 miles from the museum.

References

External links

 

1935 establishments in Scotland
Museums established in 1935
Museums in Highland (council area)
Living museums in the United Kingdom
Open-air museums in Scotland
Kingussie